Freedom fries was a politically motivated renaming of French fries in the United States. The term was created in February 2003 in a North Carolina restaurant, and was widely publicized a month later when the then Republican Chairman of the Committee on House Administration, Bob Ney, renamed the menu item in three Congressional cafeterias. The political renaming occurred in context of France's opposition to the proposed invasion of Iraq. Although some restaurants around the nation adopted the renaming, the term became unpopular, in part due to decreasing popularity of the Iraq War. After Ney's resignation as Chairman in 2006, the change of name in congressional cafeterias was reverted.

Background

French war-opposition
After the September 11 attacks by Al-Qaeda and the declaration of a "War on Terror" by President George W. Bush, an invasion of Iraq was proposed. During the United Nations Security Council deliberations, French Minister of Foreign Affairs Dominique de Villepin made it clear France would neither support nor participate in the invasion, and that it would veto any resolution that mandates an invasion of Iraq. Though Russia and China also opposed the invasion, they had not threatened to use their veto power on the Security Council; as such, France was perceived as the main barrier to the American and British effort to secure a UN mandate for invasion. This caused some Americans to accuse France of betrayal, reigniting prior anti-French sentiment in the United States.

Initial renaming
Renaming was initiated in February 2003 by Beaufort, North Carolina, "Cubbie's" restaurant owner Neal Rowland, who said he was motivated by similar actions against Germany in World War I, when "sauerkraut was called liberty cabbage, and frankfurters were renamed hot dogs." (The term hot dog was in use well before the outbreak of World War I. In fact, sauerkraut was renamed victory cabbage and Frankfurters were renamed liberty dogs.)  In an interview about the name change, Rowland commented, "since the French are backing down [from the war], French fries and French everything needs to be banned." In March 2007, Rowland obtained a trademark registration for the term "freedom fries", which was cancelled in November 2013.

U.S. House adoption

On March 11, 2003, Republican U.S. Representatives Bob Ney and Walter B. Jones directed the three House cafeterias to change all references to French fries and French toast on menus, and replace them with Freedom fries and Freedom toast, respectively. Jones chose to follow Cubbie's example by circulating a letter to his colleagues advocating their renaming because, he said, "the French were 'sitting on the sidelines. As Ney was Chairman of the United States House Committee on House Administration, the action did not require any vote, as the committee has authority over House cafeterias. According to a statement released by Ney, the renaming was intended to express displeasure with France's "continued refusal to stand with their U.S. allies." The statement further read: "This action today is a small but symbolic effort to show the strong displeasure many on Capitol Hill have with our so-called ally, France." When asked about his view on the change, Jones said it was a "lighthearted gesture." This also came to apply to dining halls for the Coalition Provisional Authority and the Multi-National Force – Iraq during the U.S. occupation of Iraq.

Reactions
In response to the change, French Embassy spokeswoman Nathalie Loiseau commented "It's exactly a non-issue ... we focus on the serious issues" and noted that fries originated in Belgium. She then remarked that France's position on the change was that they were "in a very serious moment dealing with very serious issues, and we are not focusing on the name [Americans] give to potatoes." After the name reversal, an embassy spokeswoman said: "our relations are definitely much more important than potatoes ... and our relations are back on track."

The first episode of Anthony Bourdain: No Reservations, an American travel and food show, was broadcast during this era. Freedom fries was shown as an example of the then-current frosty relations. It was named "Why the French Don't Suck."

In a 2005 opinion poll by Gallup, participants were asked if they felt the renaming of French fries and toast was "a silly idea or a sincere expression of patriotism;" 66% answered it was silly, 33% answered it was patriotic, and 1% had no opinion. Several restaurants followed the Houses' change, and the name is still used by Army Navy in the Philippines in order to complement the latter restaurant's military theme. Opposing the name change, The Saturn Cafe in Santa Cruz, California, changed their menu to "Impeach George W. Bush fries." Meanwhile, Reckitt Benckiser, maker of French's mustard, were sufficiently concerned about the movement to publicly clarify that its brand derived from a family name.

Massachusetts Democratic Congressman Barney Frank noted that the change made "Congress look even sillier than it sometimes looks," New York Democratic Congressman José Serrano characterized the renaming as "petty grandstanding," and urged fellow legislators to concentrate on more pressing issues.

In the March 15, 2003, episode of Saturday Night Live, Tina Fey reported this on the satirical Weekend Update: "In a related story, in France, American cheese is now referred to as 'idiot cheese.'" The 2006 documentary Freedom Fries: And Other Stupidity We'll Have to Explain to Our Grandchildren directed by Carl Christman took a comedic viewpoint on American consumerism and patriotism. In the episode "Stan Knows Best" of American Dad!, after being asked how his French toast is, the main character Stan remarks: "Smelly and ungrateful! But this American toast is delicious." In the comic strip Doonesbury, the characters Mark Slackmeyer and Zonker Harris criticized the name change in French. Slackmeyer said that, translated, the U.S. liberated France in World War II; and that many French newspaper headlines after 9/11 were "We are all American." At the end, he states that the anti-French were "jingoistic, self-regarding conquer-monkeys!" The French American indie band Freedom Fry chose their name based on the Freedom Fries phenomenon. In 2005, Robert Plant and his band Strange Sensation released the album Mighty ReArranger, which contains the track '"Freedom Fries," an anti-war song whose lyrics contains the words "Freedom fries and burns and scars, the liberator goes too far."

Policy reversal
On August 2, 2006, the House cafeteria menus were changed back without any announcement. The change was made by the new House Administration Committee Chairman, Vern Ehlers, who replaced Ney following his resignation due to a scandal. When asked about his decision, Ehlers responded, "It's no big deal ... It's not news." When asked in 2005 about his opinion on the "freedom fries" episode, Walter B. Jones responded, "I wish it had never happened."

References

External links

"House restaurants change name of 'french fries' and 'french toast'", CNN.com, March 11, 2003
Johnny Depp on the Freedom Fries incident, "U.S. is like a stupid puppy", CNN.com, September 3, 2003

2003 neologisms
2000s fads and trends
Francophobia in North America
American political neologisms
Propaganda in the United States
Iraq War
Euphemisms
American nationalism
France–United States relations
108th United States Congress
Food politics
French fries
Fast food
Political terminology
Linguistic controversies